Exeter College Boat Club (ECBC) is the boat club of Exeter College, Oxford, England.  The club trains on the Thames on the Isis stretch in Oxford and at Abingdon, Oxfordshire.

The Boat Club competes primarily in Torpids and Summer Eights bumps races in Oxford. However, it also races at various external events, such as Wallingford Regatta.

The college has a boathouse on Christ Church Meadow which it shares with Brasenose College Boat Club.

History

There is no record of Exeter College putting a crew on the river before 1823.  The Exeter College Boat Club would appear to have been founded in 1823 or 1824 under the impetus of Henry Bulteel.  Bulteel had been an undergraduate at Brasenose College, and stroked Brasenose to the headship in 1821 and 1822.  Bulteel became a Fellow of Exeter College in 1823, and the Boat Club seemes to have been formed at that time.

Exeter College Boat Club first took part in Summer Eights in 1824, with Bulteel stroking.  That year they rowed in the famous "White Boat", which had been built in the Plymouth dockyard, and brought to Oxford by Brasenose College boatman, Stephen Davis.  Being a coastal boat, it was found to sit too high out of the water to be rowed effectively on the Isis.  The boat was therefore cut down to reduce the height of the gunwales, and it was in this boat that the College won its first headship in 1824.

From 1827-30 there was no Exeter eight on the river.  The colours of the club, adopted around 1837 were red and black, the colours of the college arms. It was presumably these colours which were used for racing kerchiefs, recorded in the Exeter College Boat Club Treasurer's Book as being purchased in 1844.  These were to be "kept peculiar to the racing crew" as opposed to other members of the College Boat Club.

In 1856 Exeter used the first keel-less boat on the river and in this they went head from 1857 until 1859. From twelfth place in 1879 they rose to fourth in 1881 and to Head in 1882. They kept the headship from 1882 to 1884 inclusive.

In 1882 Exeter won the Grand Challenge Cup at Henley Royal Regatta.

Uniform

Exeter is associated with the colour red, which features prominently on its crest. The colour is used in racing kits, blazers, ties and blades.

The first known use of a tie in club colours was by members of Exeter College eight. In 1880, they took the ribbons off their boaters and tied them around their necks as a way to identify with their college. 

Members who have raced in the first crews in Torpids are granted the right to wear this tie. Members who have raced in the first boats in Summer Eights are permitted to wear the club blazer. The blazer is peony red, with black trim. Captains are entitled to an extra stripe on the sleeve.

Results

Torpids
Headship
 Men: 1846-47, 1854-57, 1859-60, 1863-65, 1867-68

Summer Eights
Headship
Men:1824, 1838, 1857-58, 1882-84

Henley Royal Regatta

The Boat Race 

Exeter College has been represented by members at the following Boat Races:

Reserves

The Women's Boat Race 

Exeter College has been represented by members at the following Boat Races:

Reserves

References

External links
 Exeter College Boat Club Homepage
 Exeter College Boat Club on the OURCs site

Rowing clubs of the University of Oxford
Boat Club
1823 establishments in England
Sports clubs established in the 1820s
Rowing clubs in Oxfordshire
Rowing clubs of the River Thames